East Isabel was a single-member constituency of the Legislative Assembly and National Parliament of Solomon Islands between 1976 and 1993. Located on Santa Isabel Island, it replaced the East Isabel/Savo constituency, and was succeeded by Gao/Bugotu (in which its final MP Nathaniel Supa was re-elected) and Maringe/Kokota.

List of MPs

Election results

1989

1984

1980

1976

References

Legislative Assembly of the Solomon Islands constituencies
Defunct Solomon Islands parliamentary constituencies
1976 establishments in the Solomon Islands
Constituencies established in 1976
1993 disestablishments in the Solomon Islands
Constituencies disestablished in 1993